Darband is a town of Balochistan, Pakistan. It is located at 26°19'0N 62°40'0E It is close to the Pakistani border with Iran. It is the center of Makran region

References

http://www.balochistan.gov.pk

Populated places in Kech District